Virginia Jaramillo Flores is a Mexican politician affiliated with the Party of the Democratic Revolution.

In 1997, she was elected to the Legislative Assembly of the Federal District as a local deputy for the Party of the Democratic Revolution (PRD), and during her term of office, she served on several legislative committees.

Jaramillo has subsequently served as Borough Mayor (Jefe Delegacional) of Delegación Cuauthtémoc (2003-2006).

References 

Living people
Party of the Democratic Revolution politicians
National Autonomous University of Mexico alumni
Year of birth missing (living people)
Place of birth missing (living people)
Mayors of places in Mexico
Members of the Congress of Mexico City
Women mayors of places in Mexico
20th-century Mexican politicians
20th-century Mexican women politicians
21st-century Mexican politicians
21st-century Mexican women politicians